Ruben Bemelmans was the defending champion but decided not to participate.
Igor Sijsling defeated Jerzy Janowicz 4–6, 6–3, 7–6(11–9) in the final.

Seeds

Draw

Finals

Top half

Bottom half

References
 Main Draw
 Qualifying Draw

Volkswagen Challenger - Singles
2012 Singles